Derek Attridge FBA (born 6 May 1945) is a South African-born British academic in the field of English literature and a current Professor of English at the University of York, a post he has held since 2003. Attridge undertakes research in South African literature, James Joyce, deconstruction and literary theory and the performance of poetry. He wrote a monograph on South African writer J. M. Coetzee.

Professor Attridge's new work, The Cambridge History of South African Literature, co-edited with Prof David Atwell of York, is the 10th work by Professor Attridge published by Cambridge University Press.

Education
Attridge received his Bachelor of Arts (BA) from Natal University in South Africa before moving to the UK to complete his Master of Arts (MA) and PhD at Clare College, Cambridge. He was a professor at Rutgers University until 1997, when he moved to the University of York.

Selected publications
Well-weighed Syllables: Elizabethan Verse in Classical Metres Cambridge University Press, 1974
The Rhythms of English Poetry Longman, 1982
Post-structuralist Joyce (co-edited with Daniel Ferrer) Cambridge University Press, 1984
The Linguistics of Writing: Arguments between Language and Literature (co-edited with Nigel Fabb, Alan Durant, and Colin MacCabe) Manchester University Press and Routledge, 1987
Post-structuralism and the Question of History (co-edited with Geoff Bennington and Robert Young) Cambridge University Press, 1987
Finnegans Awake: The Dream of Interpretation, James Joyce Quarterly, Volume 27, Number 1, European Perspectives (Fall, 1989), pp 11-29, University of Tulsa, Tulsa OK, 1989
Peculiar Language: Literature as Difference from the Renaissance to James Joyce. Cornell University Press and Methuen, 1988; reissued, Routledge, 2004
The Cambridge Companion to James Joyce (edited) Cambridge University Press 1990; second, revised edition, 2004
Acts of Literature, by Jacques Derrida (edited) Routledge, 1992
Poetic Rhythm: An Introduction Cambridge University Press, 1995
Writing South Africa: Literature, Apartheid, and Democracy 1970-1995 (co-edited with Rosemary Jolly). Cambridge University Press, 1998
Joyce Effects: On Language, Theory, and History Cambridge University Press, 2000
Semicolonial Joyce (co-edited with Marjorie Howes) Cambridge University Press, 2000
Meter and Meaning: An Introduction to Rhythm in Poetry (with Thomas Carper) Routledge, 2003
J. M.Coetzee and the Ethics of Reading: Literature in the Event University of Chicago Press and KwaZulu-Natal University Press, 2004
The Singularity of Literature Routledge, 2004
Ulysses: A Casebook (edited) Oxford University Press, 2004
How to Read Joyce Granta Books, 2007
Reading and Responsibility: Deconstruction’s Traces Edinburgh University Press, 2010
Theory after 'Theory''' (co-edited with Jane Elliott) Routledge, 2011The Cambridge History of South African Literature (co-edited with David Attwell) Cambridge University Press, 2012Moving Words: Forms of English Poetry Oxford University Press, 2013Derek Attridge in Conversation (with David Jonathan Bayot and Francisco Roman Guevara) Sussex Academic Press and De La Salle University Press, 2015The Craft of Poetry: Dialogues on Minimal Interpretation (with Henry Staten) Routledge, 2015The Work of Literature'' Oxford University Press, 2015

Previous appointments
 Lecturer/Senior Lecturer - University of Southampton (1973–1984)
 Professor - University of Strathclyde (1984–1988)
 Various foreign appointments, including Leverhulme Research Professor - Rutgers University (1988–1998)

Honours and awards
 Guggenheim Fellowship (1993-4)
 Robert Fitzgerald Prosody Prize (1999)
 ESSE Book Award (2006)
 Fellow - British Academy (2007)

References

External links
 University of York profile
 Audio of Derek Attridge's lecture "Reading and Responsibility." at Walter Chapin Simpson Center for the Humanities on 16 October 2007.
The Cambridge History of South African Literature - A link to Dr. Attridge's new Cambridge title, his 10th book to be published by the press.

British literary theorists
Academics of the University of York
Academics of the University of Southampton
Academics of the University of Strathclyde
Living people
University of Natal alumni
Alumni of Clare College, Cambridge
Rutgers University faculty
1945 births
Fellows of the British Academy